The Central Association of the Finnish Associations of Peace (SRK) is a Conservative Laestadian organization in Finland. It is part of Conservative Laestadianism and its sister organization in North America is Laestadian Lutheran Church. SRK has 179 Associations of Peace in Finland and eight in Russia. It has also sister organizations in Sweden and Estonia. It does mission work in 18 countries.

SRK's services in English-speaking countries 
Great Britain
London:
Church of England Holy Trinity, 3 Bryan Road, Rotherhithe, London, SE16 5 HF.

See also 
Laestadianism
Laestadianism in America
Association of Peace
SFC, Sveriges fridsföreningarnas centralorganisation
Estonian Lutheran Association of Peace

References

External links 
SRK
A history of the SRK and the Laestadian Lutheran Church.

Lutheranism in Finland
Lutheran organizations
Laestadianism